"Why Me?" is the second single by PJ & Duncan. It was their first to reach the UK Singles Chart top 40.

Track listing
CD single

Charts

1994 singles
1994 songs
Ant & Dec songs
Songs written by Deni Lew
Songs written by Nicky Graham
Telstar Records singles